Sergio Castañeda (born 5 November 1992) is a Colombian footballer who plays as a midfielder, most recently for Septemvri Sofia.

Career
In the summer of 2018 he joined Septemvri Sofia. His contract was ended on 24 November of the same year after playing just 2 official matches.

References

External links
 

1992 births
Living people
Association football midfielders
FC Septemvri Sofia players
First Professional Football League (Bulgaria) players
Colombian footballers
Colombian expatriate footballers
Expatriate footballers in Bulgaria
Expatriate footballers in Peru
Cúcuta Deportivo footballers
Valledupar F.C. footballers
Sportspeople from Antioquia Department